Roger de Charlton was Archdeacon of Totnes from 1325 until 1338 .

References

Archdeacons of Totnes